Tallaperla is a genus of roach-like stoneflies in the family Peltoperlidae. There are about seven described species in Tallaperla.

Species
These seven species belong to the genus Tallaperla:
 Tallaperla anna (Needham & Smith, 1916)
 Tallaperla cornelia (Needham & Smith, 1916)
 Tallaperla elisa Stark, 1983
 Tallaperla laurie (Ricker, 1952)
 Tallaperla lobata Stark, 1983
 Tallaperla maiyae Kondratieff, Kirchner & Zuellig, 2007
 Tallaperla maria (Needham & Smith, 1916) (common roachfly)

References

Further reading

External links

 

Plecoptera
Articles created by Qbugbot